A one-minute film is a micro movie that lasts exactly 60 seconds. Although it belongs to the microcinema constellation, it is distinct for being precisely timed. There are film festivals dedicated to it.

The one-minute film implies a creative challenge due to its brevity, which demands an exercise of synthesis when writing the script. It is appreciated by filmmakers and film schools as a tool to deepen cinematic understanding and a way to acquire, with its realization, new levels of craftsmanship.

The appearance of one-minute films can be traced back to the birth of cinema, with the first pieces by Auguste and Louis Lumière being very close to one minute long.

One-Minute film festivals 

 Filminute
 Croatian Minute Movie Cup
 Gotta Minute Film Festival – Edmonton, Canada
 1-Minute Film Competition, Australia and New Zealand
 One Minute Story Film Festival, New Jersey, United States.
 One Minute Film & Video Festival, Aarau, Switzerland.
 Quickie Fest: The One Minute Movie Festival New York, United States.
 Cineminuto Córdoba, Argentina.
 Festival Internacional de Cineminuto, Mexico.
  Brasil. 
 Oneminutes

See also
 Short film
 Micro movie
 List of short film festivals

References